"Spy Hard" is a song by "Weird Al" Yankovic used as the theme song to the film of the same name. The song was originally released as a B-side on the "Gump" single, and was later re-released as its own single. It has never appeared on one of Yankovic's studio albums, but was included as a track on the Medium Rarities disc of his Squeeze Box boxed set.

Music video
The opening title sequence to the actual film Spy Hard is a pastiche of the title sequences from the James Bond films designed by Maurice Binder - specifically 1965's Thunderball, complete with multiple colored backgrounds, silhouetted figures, and "wavy" text. The song itself was a pastiche of songs used during James Bond title sequences, complete with an orchestra (conducted by Bill Conti, who composed the music for the 1981 Bond film For Your Eyes Only) and spy-themed lyrics.

An urban legend states that during the recording of the theme to Thunderball, Tom Jones held the song's final note long enough to pass out; in this film, Yankovic holds it long enough to make his head explode. Originally, Yankovic had planned to loop the note to the required length, but in the studio, he discovered he was able to hold the note long enough that no looping was required.

During the music video, Yankovic interacts with the titles twice. The first time occurs when the film's title is smacked away by Yankovic as he rises up into the shot. The second time, Yankovic glances towards his name as he is credited for the opening titles, proudly smirking immediately after. These are the only titles to appear in the video included on music video collections.

The sequence was later included on "Weird Al" Yankovic: The Videos, then again on "Weird Al" Yankovic: The Ultimate Video Collection. While he had permission to include the title sequence (which he had directed), he did not have permission to use the actual printed credits from the film.  Therefore, all names and titles had to be taken out, thus making the video slightly confusing, looking like Al was smacking thin air and glancing at nothing and smirking for no reason (this is the version Al has on his YouTube channel). When released on "Weird Al" Yankovic: The Ultimate Video Collection the title of the film and his credit were put back in. Another version of the opening title sequence was released that contained multiple clips from the actual film.

End credits version
There is an alternate version of the song, which is played during the end credits of Spy Hard where the lyrics are changed from "The name of this movie is Spy Hard / They call it Spy Hard / You're watching Spy Hard / It's the theme from Spy Hard!" to "The name of this movie was Spy Hard / They called it Spy Hard / You just saw Spy Hard / It's the end of Spy Hard!" This version has never been commercially released.

See also
List of singles by "Weird Al" Yankovic
List of songs by "Weird Al" Yankovic

References

External links

"Weird Al" Yankovic songs
1996 singles
Songs about spies
James Bond parodies
Music videos directed by "Weird Al" Yankovic
Songs written by "Weird Al" Yankovic
Songs written for films
1996 songs
Scotti Brothers Records singles